Time of Indifference is a 1964 Italian  film directed by Francesco Maselli and based on the novel Gli indifferenti by Alberto Moravia. It stars  Claudia Cardinale.

Plot    
A penniless countess falls in love with a cad, unaware that he is also involved on the side with her beautiful daughter.

Cast
Claudia Cardinale as Carla
Rod Steiger as Leo
Shelley Winters as Lisa
Tomas Milian as Michele
Paulette Goddard as Maria Grazia

References

External links

1964 films
1960s English-language films
English-language Italian films
1960s Italian-language films
Films directed by Francesco Maselli
Films set in Rome
Films based on Italian novels
Films based on works by Alberto Moravia
Films with screenplays by Suso Cecchi d'Amico
Films scored by Giovanni Fusco
1960s multilingual films
Italian multilingual films
1960s Italian films